Namak is the Persian, Urdu and Hindi word for common salt.

Namak may also refer to:

Namak, South Korea
Namak-ri
Namaklan-e Olya, Iran
Namaklan-e Sofla, Iran
Namak, Afghanistan 
Namak Lake, Iran
Namak (film), a Bollywood film starring Sanjay Dutt

See also
Namek
Namakkal
Namakagon (disambiguation)